Torres may refer to:

People

Torres (surname), a Spanish and Portuguese surname
Torres (musician), singer-songwriter Mackenzie Scott
Torres (album), 2013 self-titled album by Torres

Places

Americas
Torres, Colorado, an unincorporated community
Torres, Rio Grande do Sul, a city in the state of Rio Grande do Sul in Brazil
Torres, Riverside County, California, Cahuilla village site in California
Torres Municipality, Lara, Venezuela
Torres del Paine, a mountain group in Torres del Paine National Park in the Patagonia region of Chile

Europe
Porto Torres, a commune and city in the Sassari province of Sardinia (Italy)
Torres Novas, a municipality in the Santarém district of Portugal
Torres Vedras, a city and a municipality in the Lisbon district of Portugal
Logudoro/Torres, historical region, Sardinia, Italy

Spain
 Torres, a municipality in the province of Jaén, Andalusia 
 Torres de Albánchez, a municipality in the province of Jaén
 Torres Torres, a municipality in the province of Valencia
 Torres de la Alameda, a municipality in the province of Madrid
 Torres de Albarracín, a municipality in the province of Teruel, Aragón
 Torres de Alcanadre, a municipality in the province of Huesca, Aragon
 Torres de Barbués, a municipality in the province of Huesca
 Torres de Berrellén, a municipality in the province of Zaragoza, Aragon
 Torres del Carrizal, a municipality in the province of Zamora
 Torres del Río, a municipality in Navarre
 Torres de Segre, a municipality in the province of Lleida, Catalonia
 Las Torres de Cotillas, a municipality in Murcia
 Dos Torres, a municipality in the province of Córdoba

Oceania
Torres Islands, in the Torba province of Vanuatu
Torres Strait, a body of water between Australia and the island of New Guinea
Shire of Torres, a shire in Australia

Other uses
Torres (board game)
Bodegas Torres, a Spanish winery
Torres Strait Island languages, three unrelated languages of northern Australia
Lo-Toga language, also known as Torres, a language of Vanuatu
S.E.F. Torres 1903, men's football club from Sardinia
Torres Calcio Femminile, women's football club from Sardinia
SsangYong Torres, a sport utility vehicle
Torres, a minor character in the TV series Rimba Racer

See also
Torre (disambiguation)
Las Torres (disambiguation)